The Sunday Working (Scotland) Act 2003 (c. 18) is an Act of the Parliament of the United Kingdom. The aim of the Act was to close an anomaly in employment law in the United Kingdom, whereby shopworkers in England and Wales had the legal right to refuse to work on a Sunday, when shopworkers in Scotland did not enjoy this right.

The anomaly arose from the different legislation in force in Scotland and the rest of the UK regarding Sunday trading. In Scotland, there was never any legislation preventing Sunday trading, and shops could choose their own opening hours. However, Sunday trading was illegal in England and Wales under the Shops Act 1950. In practice, Scottish shops did not usually open on a Sunday as a matter of custom.

Towards the end of the 20th century, demand for Sunday trading increased, and many Scottish shops began to open on a Sunday. An Act of Parliament, the Sunday Trading Act 1994 was passed to allow shops to trade on a Sunday in England and Wales, subject to certain conditions. The 1994 Act also gave shopworkers in England and Wales the right to refuse to work on a Sunday (unless their contract was for work solely on a Sunday). However, as the Act did not extend to Scotland, the same rights were not enjoyed by Scottish shopworkers.

Despite the differences most retailers did not force Sunday working on staff in Scotland and, generally, they were treated the same as staff in the rest of the UK, particularly the Scottish staff of UK wide chains. However, in 2001, the retail chain, Argos sparked fury in Scotland when they sacked several Scottish employees for refusing to work on a Sunday. Although they later backed down, several Scottish MPs raised questions on the different legal rights between the different parts of the UK, and demanded that the right to refuse to work on a Sunday be enjoyed by workers in Scotland also. Thus, a Private Member's Bill was laid before Parliament by Malcolm Savidge, MP for Aberdeen North.

Section 1 - Sunday working: shop and betting workers in Scotland
This section amends the Employment Rights Act 1996. It came into force on 6 April 2004.

Sections 3 and 4
Sections 3 and 4 came into force on 10 July 2003.

References

External links
 BBC News- Argos Sunday working climbdown

UK legislation 

United Kingdom labour law
Acts of the Parliament of the United Kingdom concerning Scotland
Retailing in Scotland
United Kingdom Acts of Parliament 2003
2003 in Scotland
Working time
Sunday
2003 in labor relations